Taine Paton (born 4 January 1989) is a South African field hockey player. At the 2012 Summer Olympics, he competed for the national team in the men's tournament, with his brother Wade Paton.  He also represented South Africa at the 2014 Commonwealth Games.

The brother of Wade Paton.

Club career
Paton first played for Gantoise in Belgium and then several years for Beerschot. In 2018 he joined his current club Antwerp.

References

External links
 
 
  (2010)
  (2014)
 
 

1989 births
Living people
South African male field hockey players
Olympic field hockey players of South Africa
2010 Men's Hockey World Cup players
Field hockey players at the 2012 Summer Olympics
2014 Men's Hockey World Cup players
Field hockey players at the 2014 Commonwealth Games
2018 Men's Hockey World Cup players
Field hockey players at the 2020 Summer Olympics
Commonwealth Games competitors for South Africa
Sportspeople from Durban
Male field hockey midfielders
Men's Belgian Hockey League players
La Gantoise HC players
Royal Beerschot THC players
Alumni of Maritzburg College
Field hockey players at the 2022 Commonwealth Games